California Southern Law School (CSLS) was a private part-time evening law school in Riverside, California. It admitted its last entering class in Fall 2016 and closed after the Spring 2020 semester. It is registered with the California State Bar Committee of Bar Examiners (CBE), but is not accredited by the CBE or approved by the American Bar Association. As a registered law school, CSLS graduates may take the California Bar Examination and upon passing the Bar, they are authorized to practice law in California.

History
California Southern Law School was founded in 1971 as Citrus Belt Law School by California Superior Court Judge Elwood M. Rich to serve students in the Inland Empire of Southern California. It took its original name from the Citrus Belt League of the Inland Empire, but changed the name in 1990 to California Southern Law School.

California State Bar CBE registration
California Southern Law School is registered with the Committee of Bar Examiners of The State Bar of California (CBE), which authorizes CSLS to operate and to grant the Juris Doctor (J.D.) law degree. CSLS is not approved by the American Bar Association or accredited by the CBE. As a registered "unaccredited" law school, CSLS students must take and pass the First-Year Law Students' Examination (commonly referred to as the "Baby Bar") administered by the CBE. Upon successful passing of the "Baby Bar" those students may continue with their law studies to obtain their J.D. degree.

Facilities
California Southern Law School maintained its facilities in stand-alone buildings in the Magnolia Center Neighborhood of Riverside, California.  Facilities include offices, classrooms and a trial practice courtroom.  Legal research and Writing classes are held at the Victor Miceli Riverside County Law Library in Downtown Riverside.

Academics

Pre-Legal Education requirements
CSLS admits students meeting the Pre-Legal Education requirements set forth by the Committee of Bar Examiners and does not require the Law School Admission Test (LSAT). The CBE requires prospective law students to complete a minimum of two years of approved college work or its equivalent before entering law school. This requirement is generally met by receiving an Associate of Arts (AA) degree, Associate of Science (AS) degree or by having completed at least 60 semester (90 quarter) units of college work applicable to a Bachelor's degree at a regionally accredited or approved school recognized by the CBE, with an average grade at least equal to that required for graduation. As allowed by the CBE, prospective CSLS students can satisfy this requirement by taking certain College Level Examination Program (CLEP) tests.

Law study
As required by the Committee of Bar Examiners, California Southern Law School offers a four-year law curriculum. The CSLS program covers all bar examination subjects likely to be tested by the CBE. All classes are held on weekday evenings which allows students to pursue a legal education and maintain full-time employment.

Judicial Instructors
Judges and commissioners who have taught at CSLS include:
Angel M. Bermudez (J.D., University of San Diego School of Law) – Instructor, Trial Practice (2011–2014) –  Superior Court Judge, Riverside County
Jim Bishop, Interim Dean (2014–present) (J.D., McGeorge School of Law (University of the Pacific) '75) – Instructor, Contracts (1976–2017) – Associate Professor of Criminal Justice and Business Law, California Baptist University, Riverside; Commissioner, Riverside County Superior Court (1990–2008)
Thomas S. Hudspeth (J.D., CSLS '81) – Instructor, Torts (1985–2015) – Commissioner, Riverside County Superior Court (1999–2012)

Noted people
Successful California Southern Law School graduates are found in many areas of the Southern California legal community. They include judges and other distinguished alumni.

Alumni judges
Barbara J. Beck ('74) – Superior Court Judge (Ret.), Santa Barbara County
John G. Evans ('79) – Superior Court Judge, Riverside County
Douglas N. Gericke ('76) – Superior Court Judge (Ret.), San Bernardino County
Arthur A. Harrison ('86) – Superior Court Judge, San Bernardino County
Christopher J. Warner ('77 honors) – Superior Court Judge (Ret.), San Bernardino County
Dale R. Wells ('93) – Superior Court Judge, Riverside County
Christopher W. Yeager ('77) – Presiding Judge, Superior Court, Imperial County

Other distinguished alumni
Virginia M. Blumenthal ('75) – Member, Riverside Community College District Board of Trustees; recipient of the Athena Award from Athena International; Los Angeles Daily Journal, "Top Women Litigators of 2007" and "Top Women Litigators 2008"
Edwin Butler (1949–2010) ('94) – Journalist and Law Librarian, San Bernardino County Law Libraries 
Terry E. Caldwell ('75) – Mayor and City Council Member (1972–2010), Victorville, California
Mary Ellen Daniels ('84) – President (2003–2004), Riverside County Bar Association
L. Alexandra Fong ('00) – Riverside County Counsel's Office
Katie Greene ('79) – Honored by blackvoicenews.com as a Community Builder for her 14 years service with the Public Service Law Corporation (PSLC) (2010 Hardy L. Brown Gala)
Michael A. Ramos ('88) – District attorney, County of San Bernardino (2002–2019) and Member, California Victim Compensation and Government Claims Board
Joe S. Rank ('83) – Riverside County Counsel (2005–2009)(Ret.)
Michael A. Scafiddi ('95) – President (2008–2009), San Bernardino County Bar Association

See also 
 List of colleges and universities in California

Notes

References

External links 
 
 State Bar of California, Future Lawyers

Law schools in California
Universities and colleges in Riverside County, California
Unaccredited institutions of higher learning in California
Educational institutions established in 1971
Private universities and colleges in California
Defunct law schools